Sandamías is one of fifteen parishes (administrative divisions) in Pravia, a municipality within the province and autonomous community of Asturias, in northern Spain.

The population is 67 (INE 2011).

Villages and hamlets
 Perzanas 
 Sandamías 
 Villagonzay (Villagonzáy)

References

Parishes in Pravia